Confluence Queens F.C. sometimes referred to as Wada Queens and Kogi Confluence Queens is a Nigerian women's association football club based in Lokoja, Kogi State. They play their home games at Confluence Stadium, and compete in the Nigeria Women Premier League, the highest tier of female football league system in Nigeria.

History 
Confluence Queens was established by David Ayo Owolabi in 1993, a prominent figure on female football matters in the state. In 2006, after the club gained promotion to the second division for the first time in her history, the state government led by Governor Ibrahim Idris provided funds and took over the administrative control of the team. In 2009, Confluence Queens was promoted to the elite division for the first time in her history. When the pro-league was re-branded to the Nigeria Women Premier League in 2013, Confluence Queens was one of the twelve teams selected to compete in the inaugural season. Honorable Abdul Adama was appointed chairman of the club but resigned in 2015.

Current squad 
<small>Squad list for 2019 season.

Notable former players 
 Kemi Fatuyesi

References

External links 
Confluence Queens at Nigeria Women Football League website

Association football clubs established in 1993
Women's football clubs in Nigeria
Nigeria Women Premier League clubs
1993 establishments in Nigeria
Kogi State
NWFL Premiership clubs